Robert J. Smithdas (June 7, 1925 – July 17, 2014) was an American deaf-blind teacher, advocate and author.

Biography
Smithdas was born in Brentwood, Pennsylvania. For many years, he was the director of Services for the Deaf-Blind at the Industrial Home for the Blind in New York City. He began his career there in 1950 after graduating with a Bachelor of Arts Degree, cum laude, from St. John's University in New York. Three years later, he became the first deaf-blind person to earn a master's degree. He achieved this distinction at New York University where he specialized in vocational guidance and rehabilitation of the disabled. In conjunction with his work at Helen Keller National Center, he was an advocate for deaf-blind education and employment. He retired in December 2008. His wife Michelle was also deaf-blind. Barbara Walters considered Smithdas her "most memorable interview".

Books

Life at My Fingertips, (1958) Doubleday
City of the Heart (poetry), (1966) Taplinger
Shared Beauty (poetry), (1982) Portal Press

References 

  Helen Keller National Center - Robert Smithdas

1925 births
2014 deaths
People from Allegheny County, Pennsylvania
American educators
American activists
American male writers
Writers from Pennsylvania
American deafblind people
St. John's University (New York City) alumni
Educators of the deaf
Educators of the blind